The Churches of Chiloé in Chile's Chiloé Archipelago are a unique architectural phenomenon in the Americas and one of the most prominent styles of Chilota architecture. Unlike classical Spanish colonial architecture, the churches of Chiloé are made entirely in native timber with extensive use of wood shingles. The churches were built from materials to resist the Chiloé Archipelago's humid and rainy oceanic climate.

Built in the 18th and 19th centuries when Chiloé Archipelago was still a part of the Spanish Crown possessions, the churches represent the fusion of Spanish Jesuit culture and local native population's skill and traditions; an excellent example of mestizo culture.

The Churches of Chiloé were designated UNESCO World Heritage Sites in 2000. The University of Chile, Fundación Cultural Iglesias de Chiloé and other institutions have led efforts to preserve these historic structures and to publicize them for their unique qualities.

Location
The sixteen churches registered as part of the World Heritage Site are concentrated in the central eastern zone of the archipelago.

See also
 History of Chiloé

Notes

External links

World Heritage Evaluation: Churches of Chiloé
Chile Nuestro Tourism - Chiloé and its Churches

Architecture in Chile
Churches in Chiloé Archipelago
Religion in Chiloé
World Heritage Sites in Chile
Roman Catholic churches in Chile
Colonial architecture in Chile
Wooden churches in Chile
Mestizo art